Chelis sordida is a moth of the family Erebidae. It was described by James Halliday McDunnough in 1921. It is found in the mountains of Alberta and British Columbia and possibly Yukon and Alaska. The habitat consists of dry rocky alpine tundra.

The length of the forewings is 15–16 mm. The forewings are charcoal grey with pale yellowish lines. The wing margin is off white. The hindwings are dark smoky grey with darker veins. Adults are on wing from July to mid-August.

This species was formerly a member of the genus Holoarctia, but was moved to Chelis along with the other species of the genera Holoarctia, Neoarctia, and Hyperborea.

References

Arctiina
Moths described in 1921